The 1974–75 Memphis Sounds season was the fifth and final season of basketball in Memphis in the American Basketball Association (ABA). Charles O. Finley had failed in running the Tams, and he let the league take the team from his reigns after two years. In July 1974, a group led by Isaac Hayes, Avron Fogelman, Kemmonis Wilson, and former ABA Commissioner Mike Storen (who resigned on July 17, 1974) took the team over. The team was renamed to Sounds, and players were soon dealt to and away from Memphis.
The March 28, 1975 game saw 8,417 see a victory over the New York Nets 111–106, the largest crowd to see the Sounds in years. The team improved by six games, and in part due to a weak division took the final playoff spot by 12 games over Virginia, the first time Memphis had made a playoff series since 1971. In the Semifinals, they lost to Kentucky in 5 games. Wilson and Hayes had to share their shares after the season ended due to losing money on the team. Afterwards, the league gave Memphis until June 1, 1975, to sell 4,000 season tickets, find new investors, and secure a more favorable lease at the Mid-South Coliseum, but the deadline passed with failure. On August 27, 1975, a group headed by David Cohan purchased the team and the franchise moved to Baltimore, to become the Baltimore Claws. However, the team never played a regular season game.

Roster
 19 Roger Brown - Small forward
 7 George Carter - Small forward
 9 Mel Daniels - Center
 21 Larry Finch - Shooting guard
 11 Stew Johnson - Power forward
 13 Collis Jones - Small forward
 11 Julius Keye - Power forward
 6 Freddie Lewis - Shooting guard
 2 Rick Mount - Shooting guard
 15 Jim O'Brien - Small forward
 25 Tom Owens - Center
 31 Ronnie Robinson - Power forward
 6 Billy Shepherd - Point guard
 4 Chuck Williams - Point guard

Final standings

Eastern Division 

Asterisk denotes playoff berth

Playoffs
Eastern Division Semifinals

References

External links
 RememberTheABA.com 1974–75 regular season and playoff results
 Memphis Sounds page

Memphis Sounds
Memphis Sounds, 1974-75
Memphis Sounds, 1974-75
Basketball in Memphis, Tennessee